Torreani is a 1951 West German drama film directed by Gustav Fröhlich and starring Fröhlich, René Deltgen and Inge Landgut. The plot revolves around a Variety show.

The film's sets were designed by the art director Erich Kettelhut.

Cast
 Gustav Fröhlich as Erich Holsten
 René Deltgen as Robert Torreani
 Inge Landgut as Marianne
 Lisa Stammer as Isabella
 Werner Stock as Conny Cleve
 Willi Rose as Koldewey
 Arno Paulsen as Bichler
 Rolf Weih as Homann
 Erna Sellmer as Francesca
 Walter Tarrach as Kriminalkommissar
 Paul Heidemann
 Paul Westermeier
 Otto Gebühr
 Victor Janson
 Erich Poremski as Kriminalkommissar
 Erwin Biegel
 Karin Luesebrink
 Hans Stiebner
 Ewald Wenck
 Carl de Vogt
 Karl Ludwig Schreiber
 Michael Symo
 Reinhold Pasch
 Hella Karsunki
 Consuelo Korn

References

Bibliography
 Hans-Michael Bock and Tim Bergfelder. The Concise Cinegraph: An Encyclopedia of German Cinema. Berghahn Books, 2009.

External links 
 

1951 films
German drama films
1951 drama films
West German films
1950s German-language films
Films directed by Gustav Fröhlich
Films set in Berlin
German black-and-white films
1950s German films